Mongkok Story is a 1996 Hong Kong film directed by Wilson Yip.

Cast
 Chan Man Fai	
 Chan San-Pang	
 Michael Chan - Fook
 Cheng Bo-Sui		
 Roy Cheung - Ching
 Chin Wing-Wai		
 Choi Hiu-Yee		
 Kwok Wai Chung		
 Edmond Leung - Leung-Ping
 Leung Kam-Sam		
 Leung Wing-Lam		
 Lok Tat-Wah	
 Man Sing	
 Anthony Wong - Lui Lone
 Wong Woh-Hing

Awards
 1996 Hong Kong Film Critics Society Award: Best screenplay and Film of Merit

See also
 Mong Kok

External links
 
 HK Cinemagic entry
 lovehkfilm.com entry

Hong Kong action drama films
1996 films
1990s Cantonese-language films
Films directed by Wilson Yip
Films set in Hong Kong
Films shot in Hong Kong
1990s Hong Kong films